Beta Circini, Latinized from β Circini, is an A-type main sequence star and is the second-brightest star in the constellation of Circinus. It has an apparent visual magnitude of approximately 4.069, which is bright enough to be viewed with the naked eye. Based upon an annual parallax shift of 35.17 mas as seen from the Earth, it is located about 93 light years from the Sun.

With a stellar classification of A3 Va, this is an A-type main-sequence star. It is between 370 and 500 million years old with around 1.3 times the Sun's radius. The star is radiating 19 times the Sun's luminosity from its photosphere at an effective temperature of 8,676 K. It has one known sub-stellar companion.

Planetary System
Beta Circini b is a distant brown dwarf companion orbiting the host star at a distance of 6,656 AU.

References

A-type main-sequence stars
Circinus (constellation)
Circini, Beta
PD-58 05875
Gliese and GJ objects
135379
074824
5670